Upstage (also known as The Mask of Comedy) is a 1926 American silent romantic drama film directed by Monta Bell, starring Norma Shearer and New York musical comedy star Oscar Shaw.

Plot
Dolly (Norma Shearer) is a stagestruck girl whose career has begun to wane until she displays show-must-go-on courage by standing-in as target in a knife-throwing act.

Cast
Norma Shearer - Dolly Haven 
Oscar Shaw - Johnny Storm 
Tenen Holtz - Sam Davis 
Gwen Lee - Dixie Mason 
Dorothy Phillips - Miss Weaver 
J. Frank Glendon - Mr. Weston 
Ward Crane - Wallace King 
Charles Meakin - Stage Manager
John T. Bambury - Midget (uncredited)

Preservation status
A print of the film has been preserved by MGM.

References

External links
 
 

1926 films
1926 romantic drama films
American romantic drama films
American silent feature films
American black-and-white films
Films about actors
Metro-Goldwyn-Mayer films
1920s American films
Silent romantic drama films
Silent American drama films